Variations of gray or grey include achromatic grayscale shades, which lie exactly between white and black, and nearby colors with low colorfulness.  A selection of a number of these various colors is shown below.

Chart of computer web color grays
Below is a chart showing the computer web color grays.  An achromatic gray is a gray color in which the red, green, and blue codes are exactly equal.  The web colors gray, gainsboro, light gray, dark gray, and dim gray are all achromatic colors.  A chromatic gray is a gray color in which the red, green, and blue codes are not exactly equal, but are close to each other, which is what makes it a shade of gray.

White and black
The colors white and black are not usually thought of as shades of gray, but they can be thought of as shades of achromatic gray, as both contain equal amounts of red, blue and green. White is at the extreme upper end of the achromatic value scale and black is at the extreme lower end of the achromatic value scale, with all the colors normally considered tones of achromatic gray colors in between.  Since achromatic colors have no hue, the hue code (h code) is left blank for achromatic colors (usually marked as a dash).

White

White is a color, the perception of which is evoked by light that stimulates all three types of color sensitive cone cells in the human eye in equal amounts and with high brightness compared to the surroundings. A white visual stimulation will be void of hue and grayness. White is the lightest possible color.

Achromatic grays
Achromatic grays are colors in which the RGB (red, green, and blue) values are exactly equal.  Since achromatic grays have no hue, the hue code (the h in the hsv values of the color) is indicated with a dash.  Achromatic grays are the axis of the color sphere, with white at the north pole and black at the south pole of the color sphere.  The various tones of achromatic gray are along the axis of the color sphere from white at the top of the axis to black at the bottom of the axis.

Gray

At right is displayed the color gray.

The first recorded use of gray as a color name in the English language was in 700.

This tone of gray (HTML gray) is universally used as the standard for gray because it is that tone of gray which is halfway between white and black.

Gainsboro

At right is displayed the web color Gainsboro

Gainsboro is a pale tone of gray.

Prior to standardization as a web color, Gainsboro was included as one of the X11 color names. It was, however, absent from the original 1987 version of the list, but present in Paul Raveling's version which added, amongst other things, "[l]ight and off-white colors, copied from several Sinclair Paints color samples".

Silver

Displayed at right is the web color silver

This color is a representation of the color of the metal silver.

This is supposed to be a metallic color; however, there is no mechanism for displaying metallic colors on a flat computer screen.

Medium gray

At right is displayed the color medium gray, or gray in the X11 color names, which is lighter than the HTML/CSS gray shown below. The coordinates in the X11 were set at 190 to avoid gray being displayed as white on 2-bit grayscale displays.

See the chart Color names that clash between X11 and HTML/CSS in the X11 color names article to see those colors which are different in HTML/CSS and X11.

Spanish gray

Spanish gray is the color that is called gris (gray in Spanish) in the Guía de coloraciones (Guide to colorations) by Rosa Gallego and
Juan Carlos Sanz, a color dictionary published in 2005 that is widely popular in the Hispanophone realm.

Davy's gray

Davy's gray is a dark gray color, made from powdered slate, iron oxide and carbon black named for Henry Davy.

The first recorded use of Davy’s gray as a color name in English was around 1940.

Off-grays
Off-grays are colors that are very close to achromatic grays, but whose red, green, and blue color codes are not exactly equal.

Xanadu

Displayed in the adjacent image is the color xanadu.

The color "xanadu" is a greenish-gray color whose name is derived from the Philodendron.

Platinum

Platinum is a color that is the metallic tint of pale grayish-white resembling the metal platinum.

This is supposed to be a metallic color; however, there is no mechanism for displaying metallic colors on a flat computer screen.

The first recorded use of platinum as a color name in English was in 1918.

Ash gray

Displayed in the adjacent image is the color ash gray.

The color ash gray is a representation of the color of ash.

The first recorded use of ash gray as a color name in English was in 1374.

Battleship gray

The color battleship gray is displayed in the adjacent image.  It is so called because the color is the shade of gray from the specular micaceous hematite paint used for rustproofing iron and steel battleships.

The normalized color coordinates for battleship gray are identical to old silver, first recorded as a color name in English in 1905.

Gunmetal

Gunmetal is a shade of gray that has a bluish purple tinge. It describes the color of several metals used in industrial applications, such as tarnished gunmetal, or parkerized steel.

Charcoal

Charcoal is a color that is a representation of the dark gray color of burned wood.

The first recorded use of charcoal as a color name in English was in 1606.

Stone gray

Stone gray is a color represented in the list of RAL classic colors from RAL colour standard. This is the main color on the Indian 500-rupee note.

Cool grays

Cool grays have noticeably bluish, greenish, or violetish hues.

Cool gray

Cool gray, is a medium light color gray mixed with the color blue.

This color is a dull shade of blue-gray.

This color is identical with color sample No. 203 (identified as gray blue) at the following website: http://tx4.us/nbs/nbs-g.htm—The ISCC-NBS Dictionary of Colo(u)r Names (1955), a website for stamp collectors to evaluate the colors of their stamps.

Poet George Sterling once wrote a poem calling San Francisco the "cool grey city of love" The phrase cool grey as applied to San Francisco refers to the frequent fogs from the Pacific Ocean that envelop the city.

Cadet gray

Cadet gray is a slightly bluish shade of gray. The first recorded use of cadet grey as a color name in English was in 1912.

Before 1912, the word cadet gray was used as a name for a type of military issue uniforms. Most famously, it was the color of the uniforms of the Confederate Army.  In 1815, it had earlier become the color of the uniforms of the United States Military Academy (West Point).

Blue-gray

Blue-gray was a Crayola crayon color from 1958 to 1990.

Glaucous

Glaucous (from the Latin glaucus, meaning "bluish-gray", from the Greek glaukos) is used to describe the pale gray or blue appearance of the surfaces of some plants, as well as in the names of birds, such as the glaucous gull (Larus hyperboreus), glaucous-winged gull (Larus glaucescens), glaucous macaw (Anodorhynchus glaucus), and glaucous tanager (Thraupis glaucocolpa).

Slate gray

Slate gray is a gray color with a slight azure tinge that is a representation of the average color of the material slate.

The first recorded use of slate gray as a color name in English was in 1705.

Gray-green

Gray-green (also known as grayish-green, greenish-gray, emerald-gray, or green-gray) is a greenish-gray color.

Marengo

Marengo is a shade of gray (black with gray tinge) or blue colors. Sometimes the color is described as the color of a wet asphalt.

Warm grays
Warm grays are colors that are noticeably brownish, pinkish grays, or reddish purple grays. The color brown is itself a dark shade of orange.  Brown colors also include dark shades of rose, red, and amber.  Pink colors include light tones of rose, red, and orange.  These tones of pink become warm grays when they are mixed with gray.

Rose quartz

There is a grayish tone of rose called rose quartz.

The first recorded use of rose quartz as a color name in English was in 1926.

Cinereous

Cinereous is a color, ashy gray in appearance, either consisting of or resembling ashes, or a gray color tinged with coppery brown. It is derived from the Latin cinereous, from cinis (ashes).

The first recorded use of cinereous as a color name in English was in 1661.

Taupe

The color displayed at right matches the color sample called taupe referenced below in the 1930 book A Dictionary of Color, the world standard for color terms before the invention of computers.  However, the word taupe may often be used to refer to lighter shades of taupe today, and therefore another name for this color is dark taupe.

The first use of taupe as a color name in English was in the early 19th century.

See also
 Eigengrau
 Feldgrau
 Payne's gray
 Shades of black
 Shades of white

References

Bibliography
Maerz, Aloys John and Paul, M. Rea (1930) A Dictionary of Color, New York: McGraw-Hill

 

fr:Gris#Noms de nuances de gris